Christopher Devlin-Young (born December 26, 1962) is an American alpine ski racer and two time Paralympic Champion, who resides in Campton, New Hampshire.  He competes as a monoskier in the LW 12–1 class.

Career
Born in San Diego, Young was paralyzed in a plane crash in Alaska while serving in the United States Coast Guard in 1982. He learned to ski at the National Disabled Veterans Winter Sports Clinic in 1986 as a "four-tracker," standing on two skis while using outriggers. He was named to the U.S. Disabled Ski Team in 1989 and competed in the 1990 Disabled Skiing World Championships in Winter Park, Colorado, winning a silver medal and two bronzes in the LW-1 class. Young missed the 1992 Winter Paralympic team but qualified for the 1994 Games in Lillehammer, Norway, where he won gold in the slalom.

In 1995 Young began a two-year hiatus from racing to coach the New England Disabled Ski team at Loon Mtn. New Hampshire, and when he returned to the sport in 1997 it was as a monoskier.  He missed the 1998 Winter Paralympics in Nagano, Japan but came back in 2002 with another gold, this time in super G, along with a silver in downhill.  With that performance he became the first skier ever to win a Paralympic skiing gold medal in two different disability classes.  He repeated his downhill performance in 2006, placing second behind teammate Kevin Bramble. In 2015, he won the Mono Skier X (X-Games), also becoming the oldest gold  medalist in the history of the competition.

References

External links
 
 
 

1962 births
Living people
American male alpine skiers
Paralympic alpine skiers of the United States
Paralympic gold medalists for the United States
Paralympic silver medalists for the United States
Paralympic medalists in alpine skiing
Alpine skiers at the 1994 Winter Paralympics
Alpine skiers at the 2002 Winter Paralympics
Alpine skiers at the 2006 Winter Paralympics
Medalists at the 1994 Winter Paralympics
Medalists at the 2002 Winter Paralympics
Medalists at the 2006 Winter Paralympics
X Games athletes
People from Campton, New Hampshire